Eupithecia anguinata is a moth in the  family Geometridae. It is found in Kenya.

References

Endemic moths of Kenya
Moths described in 1902
anguinata
Moths of Africa